XLR8 was a Filipino boy band under VIVA Records. The group composed of Arkin del Rosario, Carlo Lazerna, the identical twins MJ and MM Magno, Kiko Ramos, Caleb Santos, AJ Muhlach and Hideaki Torio. They are regularly seen on the Sunday noontime variety show Party Pilipinas aired on GMA Network. The group was accused of plagiarizing Super Junior's "Sorry, Sorry", both groups did not issue an official statement.

History

Pre-debut and debut: 2008–2010 
Sometime in 2008,Vic Del Rosario of VIVA media franchise decided to form a boyband under his recording company VIVA Records. First to be part of the project boyband was then stage performer Kiko Ramos followed by TV host and commercial model Hideaki Torio, ramp and commercial model Carlo Lazerna and church choir singer Caleb Santos. After a series of training VIVA decided to add one more member; then theater actor and commercial model Arkin del Rosario soon joined the line up. Still unsatisfied, VIVA added two more members who happened to be twin brothers; former Star Magic contract talent Melmar Magno and aspiring singer Meljohn Magno . Several members joined and left but the last to seal the final eight members was commercial model, aspiring actor and VIVA's contract talent AJ Muhlach. All final eight members continued to train together for their singing and dancing skills and then worked on their debut album. The group made their debut on March 28, 2010 on the popular variety show Party Pilipinas with their debut single "You're so Hot." Although the group has been receiving mixed reviews, they have been progressing over the passed year by performing at various mall shows and have made various concert appearances. They are regularly seen on the hit variety show Party Pilipinas.

Temporary member departure and disbandment 
In early 2011, Viva Records confirmed that XLR8 members Hideaki Torio and AJ Muhlach would be temporarily leaving the group to film the new TV series Bagets Just Got Lucky which is to be aired on TV5. Because of this, GMA, the channel that is responsible for broadcasting Party Pilipinas, had temporarily suspended the two members from performing at any GMA-sponsored events and allowed them to perform at any non-GMA sponsored events. Until the members finished filming the series, substitutes would be taking their places performing on Party Pilipinas. MM and MJ were larer featured on KMJS in 2016. Fun fact: They got their name from an alien in Ben 10.

Members 
AJ Muhlach
Hideaki Torio
Arkin del Rosario
Caleb Santos
Carlo Lazerna
Kiko Ramos
MJ Magno
MM Magno

Discography

Studio album

Singles

Music videos

Featured XLR8 tracks

Awards

References 

Filipino boy bands
Filipino pop music groups
Musical groups from Metro Manila
Musical groups established in 2010
Musical groups disestablished in 2012
2010 establishments in the Philippines
GMA Network personalities